Philippsburg (Baden) station is a railway station in the municipality of Philippsburg, located in the Karlsruhe district in Baden-Württemberg, Germany.

References

Railway stations in Baden-Württemberg
Buildings and structures in Karlsruhe (district)
Rhine-Neckar S-Bahn stations